{{Infobox settlement
| name                    = Lesnice
| other_name              = 
| settlement_type         = Municipality

| image_skyline           = LesniceRychta.jpg
| image_caption           = ''Advocatus seat
| image_flag              = Lesnice flag.gif
| image_shield            = LesniceZnak.jpg

| subdivision_type        = Country
| subdivision_name        = 
| subdivision_type1       = Region
| subdivision_name1       = Olomouc
| subdivision_type2       = District
| subdivision_name2       = Šumperk

| image_map               = 
| map_caption             = 
| pushpin_map             = Czech Republic
| pushpin_relief          = 1
| pushpin_map_caption     = Location in the Czech Republic
| coordinates             = 
| coordinates_footnotes   = 

| leader_title            = 
| leader_name             = 

| established_title       = First mentioned
| established_date        = 1348

| area_footnotes          = 
| area_total_km2          = 7.33

| elevation_footnotes     = 
| elevation_m             = 274

| population_as_of        = 2022-01-01
| population_footnotes    = 
| population_total        = 643
| population_density_km2  = auto

| timezone1               = CET
| utc_offset1             = +1
| timezone1_DST           = CEST
| utc_offset1_DST         = +2

| postal_code_type        = Postal codes
| postal_code             = 789 01
| area_code_type          = 
| area_code               = 

| website                 = 
| footnotes               = 
}}Lesnice''' is a municipality and village in Šumperk District in the Olomouc Region of the Czech Republic. It has about 600 inhabitants.

Notable people
Lubomír Doležel (1922–2017), literary theorist

References

Villages in Šumperk District